The men's road race at the 1959 UCI Road World Championships was the 26th edition of the event. The race took place on Sunday 14 August 1959 in Zandvoort, the Netherlands. The race was won by André Darrigade of France.

Final classification

References

Men's Road Race
UCI Road World Championships – Men's road race
UCI Road World Championships – Men's road race
UCI Road World Championships – Men's road race
UCI Road World Championships – Men's road race